Kangaru School is located in the Embu County, Kenya. It was built by the first missionaries that arrived in Kenya during the colonialism in the 1920s. It was rebuilt in 1947 by Sir Robin Wainright on a Harambee basis. There is a nearby village called Kangaru which is probably where the name comes from. There is a river close to the school, the Kapingazi River.

The student population is about 1400 with a teaching staff of about 60. Being an extra-county school, the majority of the students are from Embu County and the neighbouring counties which together with Embu were part of the former Eastern province

The school offers an 8-4-4 curriculum whereby students sit for the Kenya Certificate of Secondary Education (KCSE) exam at the end of a four-year programme. Subjects offered at Kangaru School range from Mathematics, Kiswahili, Christian and Islamic Religious Education, Geography, Chemistry, Biology, Physics, History and Government, Home Science, Computer Studies, French, English to Business Studies.

Kangaru later became a co-educational school, after which in 1989 it was split into separate institutions for boys and girls. The students live in 8 houses referred to as houses, named Mwea, Embu, Gichugu, Ndia, Gachoka, Mbeere, Hollywood and Runyenjes.

Notable alumni are Adan Mohammed, Mutava Musyimi, Ben Mutua Jonathan Muriithi, popularly known as BMJ Muriithi, who is a US-based journalist working with the Voice of America, a popular benga artiste.

References

Embu County
High schools and secondary schools in Kenya
Education in Eastern Province (Kenya)